Double Crossbones is a 1951 American comedy adventure film distributed by Universal International, produced by Leonard Goldstein, directed by Charles Barton, and stars Donald O'Connor and Helena Carter. It was shot in Technicolor and was released on January 22. The story is of shopkeeper apprentice Davey Crandall becoming a pirate after being accused falsely of being involved of selling stolen goods.

Plot
In the late 1700s, Charleston, South Carolina, is a haven for pirates, who sell their plunder there. One day, Davey Crandall (Donald O'Connor) and his friend and coworker, Tom Botts (Will Geer), see the ship Liverpool Queen enter the harbor. As soon as the cargo is unloaded and transferred to the shelves of Davey's employer, cranky shopkeeper Caleb Nicholas (Morgan Farley), Charleston territorial governor Gerald Elden (John Emery) brings his ward, Lady Sylvia Copeland (Helena Carter), and British aristocrats Lord and Lady Montrose to view the new wares.

While Sylvia and Davey flirt innocently, Lord Montrose recognizes a pin stolen from an English friend amid the booty. Although the governor is secretly in partnership with Caleb to fence pirate plunder, he feigns shock and orders Caleb, Davey, and Tom to be arrested. Davey and Tom manage to escape, but Caleb is brought before Elden, who shoots him to keep him from talking. Then, he surprises Sylvia by proposing to her. When she spurns him, he orders her to accompany him to Virginia and, realizing that she loves Davey, vows to kill him.

That night, Davey and Tom buy passage from Captain "Bloodthirsty" Ben Wickett (Charles McGraw) on his ship, the Defiance.  Wickett takes their money, but plans to throw them overboard.

At sea the next morning, Wickett attempts to get the two drunk, but Davey, who is allergic to alcohol, refuses. When they are shown the plank they are to walk, Davey grabs a bottle and drinks, causing his face to break out in hives. He convinces the pirates that he has the dreaded pox, and they abandon ship in a panic. Davey and Tom sail on alone until they spot another ship, the Southern Gypsy. Not realizing that the Defiance sports a pirate flag, they are puzzled when the Southern Gypsy flees. They fire a cannon as a signal for help, only to dismast the other ship. Through a spyglass, Davey sees Elden on-deck, so Tom suggests he disguise himself as pirate "Bloodthirsty Dave."

After he and Tom board the Southern Gypsy, Elden recognizes Davey, but Tom insists that being a shopkeeper's apprentice was merely a ruse and that Davey actually is a pirate captain. Sylvia appears and hears Davey's "threats" if his demands are not met. She denounces him and informs Elden that she will marry him. There is no cargo aboard, only prisoners bound for a debtors' prison, so Dave takes them and lets the Southern Gypsy go. Tom says there is only one safe place for them, the pirate stronghold of Tortuga. The freed prisoners agree, so Davey has no choice but to lead them there.

On Tortuga, Davey is brought before a pirate tribunal, which includes Henry Morgan (Robert Barrat), Captain Kidd (Alan Napier), Mistress Ann Bonney (Hope Emerson), Captain Long Ben Avery (Glenn Strange), and Blackbeard (Louis Bacigalupi). They test Davey's alleged killer instinct by pitting him against Blackbeard. Davey wins the fight and is accepted into the Pirate Brotherhood. He learns that they are funded by a mysterious American, whose messenger Davey quickly recognizes as Elden's valet. He begs the pirates to help him attack Elden in Charleston, but they refuse and he is forced to go alone.

Back in Charleston, Davey disguises himself as a British aristocrat in order to infiltrate a costume ball Elden is holding for Sylvia. He spirits Sylvia away and, by describing the wedding gown that Elden bought from a pirate, convinces her that her fiancé is corrupt. However, Elden recognizes Davey and jails him. That night, Sylvia sneaks out to the Defiance and plans with Tom to paint a miniature armada on the lens of a telescope, which will trick Elden into thinking he is being attacked by pirates. The trick works, and Elden signs a confession.

Davey then races to Lord Montrose's ship, but Elden gets there first and shoots him. Afterwards, Tom and Davey's crew arrive and a sword fight breaks out. Just as Davey chases Elden up a sail, the Pirate Brotherhood arrives to help. Panicking, Elden falls into the ocean.

In Tortuga months later, Davey is married to Sylvia and is revered as a powerful pirate. He arranges for a pardon for his fellow pirates, but news of a nearby ship loaded with gold quickly ends their reformation.

Cast
 Donald O'Connor as Davey Crandall
 Helena Carter as Lady Sylvia Copeland
 Will Geer as Tom Botts
 John Emery as Governor Gerald Elden
 Stanley Logan as Lord Montrose
 Kathryn Givney as Lady Montrose
 Hayden Rorke as Malcolm Giles
 Morgan Farley as Caleb Nicholas
 Robert Barrat as Henry Morgan
 Alan Napier as Captain Kidd
 Glenn Strange as Captain Ben Avery
 Louis Bacigalupi as Blackbeard
 Hope Emerson as Mistress Ann Bonney
 Charles McGraw as Captain "Bloodthirsty" Ben Wickett

Production
The film was originally known as Half a Buccaneer and was announced in April 1949 with Donald O'Connor attached from the beginning. Oscar Brodney wrote the script. The title was changed in August by which time Helena Carter had been assigned to co star. Filming started in late August.

Some of the shots involving the ships at sea were taken from the Universal International 1950 film Buccaneer's Girl.

O'Connor dances and sings a song in the film, "Percy Had a Heart", during the tavern scene and performs throughout the entire song.

Famous Universal-International actor Jeff Chandler narrates the very opening of the film, talking about the history of the world's most vicious pirates and introducing viewers to O'Connor's character.

Reception
In an interview in 2003, O'Connor later described the film as "one of the worst pictures ever made", as a part of a backhand comment when he was mentioning him running up a wall. Despite this comment from the star himself, many viewers enjoy the film.

Filmink called the film "very underwhelming" and pointed out it was the one time Helena Carter appeared opposite a male co-star who was younger than her.

Home media availability
Universal released this film on DVD on May 8, 2007 as part of the Pirates of the Golden Age Movie Collection, a 2-disc set featuring three other films (Against All Flags, Buccaneer's Girl, and Yankee Buccaneer). This film was re-released on August 28, 2014 as a stand-alone DVD as part of the Universal Vault Series.

References

External links

Double Crossbones at Letterbox DVD
Review of film at Variety

1951 films
Pirate films
American swashbuckler films
1950s adventure comedy films
1950s historical adventure films
1950s historical comedy films
American adventure comedy films
American historical adventure films
American historical comedy films
Films set in Charleston, South Carolina
Universal Pictures films
Films scored by Frank Skinner
1951 comedy films
1950s English-language films
Films directed by Charles Barton
1950s American films